Evans Ganapamo (born 19 August 1994) is a French-Central African professional basketball player who plays for the Cape Town Tigers in the Basketball Africa League (BAL).  He played college basketball at the University of New Orleans and Prairie View A&M University. Internationally, he represents the Central African Republic national team.

Early life and college career 
Ganapamo was born in France to Central African parents and moved to the United States at age 12 where his father was working as a doctor. He played college basketball for the University of New Orleans after receiving a scholarship. Ganapamo suffered from injuries and a debilitating staphylococcus infection in his second season. He moved to Prairie View A&M for the 2016–17 season.

Professional career 
Ganapamo started his professional career in 2016 with SB/DJK Rosenheim of the German fourth-tier Regionaliga, where he averaged 22.9 points and 7.8 rebounds per game.

He then went on to play three seasons for Paris Basketball of the French second-tier LNB Pro B. He suffered a torn ACL in a friendly game for the CAF, causing him to miss most of his first two seasons in Paris. In the 2020–21 season, Ganapamo played 14 games in the LNB Pro A.

In 2021, Ganapamo joined the newly established South African team Cape Town Tigers. After winning the national championship, he helped the Tigers qualify for their first-ever Basketball Africa League (BAL) appearance. In his first BAL season, he averaged a team-high 16.2 points per game. Ganapamo signed for the Milwaukee Bucks to play in the 2022 NBA Summer League, becoming the second BAL player to play in the NBA Summer League after Anas Mahmoud in 2021.

National team career 
After a successful season with Rosenborg, Ganapamo was selected for the Central African Republic national team and made his debut in 2018 in the 2019 World Cup qualification.

Honours 
Cape Town Tigers

 2× South African National Basketball Championship: (2021, 2022)

Personal 
Ganapamo's parents are from the Central African Republic.

References

External links 

 Evans Ganapamo at Eurobasket.com

Living people
Cape Town Tigers players
French men's basketball players
French sportspeople of Central African Republic descent
Central African Republic expatriate sportspeople in South Africa
Central African Republic men's basketball players
Paris Basketball players
1994 births
Small forwards

People from Montpellier